Desert Rock Airport is a private-use airport located three miles (5 km) southwest of the central business district of Mercury, in Nye County, Nevada, United States. The airport is located on the Nevada Test Site and is owned by the United States Department of Energy.

History 
The airfield is located on the site of the former Camp Desert Rock, a US Army facility.

Facilities 

 Runway 2/20: 7515 x 100 ft (2291 x 30 m), surface: asphalt

References

External links 
 Aviation weather for NV65
 AirNav entry for NV65

Airports in Nevada
Buildings and structures in Nye County, Nevada
Transportation in Nye County, Nevada